is a Japanese professional shogi player ranked 4-dan.

Early life
Ida was born in Kyoto, Japan on December 6, 1996. He became interested in shogi after seeing a column about it in a newspaper.

Shogi

Apprentice professional
Ida entered the Japan Shogi Association's apprentice school in September 2009 under the guidance of shogi professional Kenji Kobayashi. Ida was promoted to the rank of apprentice professional 3-dan in April 2017 and obtained full professional status and the rank of 4-dan after tying for first place in the 68th 3-dan League (October 2020March 2021) with a record of 13 wins and 5 losses.

Promotion history
The promotion history for Ida is as follows.

6-kyū: September 2010
3-dan: April 2017 
4-dan: April 1, 2021

References

External links
 ShogiHub: Professional Player Info · Ida, Akihiro

Japanese shogi players
Living people
Professional shogi players
Professional shogi players from Kyoto Prefecture
1996 births
People from Kyoto